This is a list of concert tours held by South Korean boy group Ateez.

The Expedition Tour

The Fellowship: Map The Treasure Tour

The Fellowship: Beginning of the End

The Fellowship: Break The Wall

Concerts and other live performances

Showcases

Joint concerts

References

Lists of concert tours
Lists of concert tours of South Korean artists
Lists of events in South Korea
South Korean music-related lists
K-pop concerts by artist